Warning Shot may refer to:
 Warning shot, a harmless artillery shot or gunshot used for warning
 Warning Shots, a compilation album by The Haunted
 Warning Shot (1967 film), a drama by Buzz Kulik
 Warning Shot (2018 film), an American drama thriller
 "Warning Shot", a song by Status Quo from the album Rock 'til You Drop